Sudbury/Coniston Airport  is located adjacent to the community of Coniston in Greater Sudbury, Ontario, Canada.

See also
 Greater Sudbury Airport
 Sudbury/Azilda Water Aerodrome
 Sudbury/Ramsey Lake Water Aerodrome

References

Registered aerodromes in Ontario
Transport buildings and structures in Greater Sudbury